The England national cricket team toured Ceylon, Australia and New Zealand in the 1929–30 season to play a Test series against the New Zealand national cricket team. This was the first Test series ever played by New Zealand. England began the tour in October 1929 in Ceylon with a single minor match and then in Australia where they played five first-class matches. The New Zealand leg of the tour began in December and, in addition to the Test series, England played each of the main provincial teams: Auckland, Wellington, Canterbury and Otago. England, captained by Harold Gilligan, won the Test series 1–0 with three matches drawn.

At the same time another English team, captained by Freddie Calthorpe, was touring the West Indies, playing the first Test series there. It was the only time one country has played in two Test matches on the same day.

The English team

 Harold Gilligan (captain) 
 Guy Earle (vice-captain) 
 Maurice Allom 
 Fred Barratt 
 Edward Benson 
 Ted Bowley
 Walter Cornford 
 Eddie Dawson
 K. S. Duleepsinhji
 Geoffrey Legge 
 Stan Nichols
 Maurice Turnbull 
 Frank Woolley 
 Stan Worthington

Apart from Woolley, who had played 55 Tests before the tour, it was an inexperienced side at Test level. Bowley had played two Tests, and Barratt, Dawson, Duleepsinhji and Legge one each; the other eight had not played a Test.

The team was selected in late June, with Arthur Gilligan, who had played 11 Tests, as captain. However, he was unable to tour owing to illness, and his younger brother Harold was selected to replace him. The other change to the original selected team was that Maurice Allom replaced Frank Watson.

Test Matches

First Test

Second Test

Third Test

Fourth Test

References

External links
England in New Zealand, 1929-30 at Cricinfo
MCC in Australia and New Zealand 1929-30 at CricketArchive
England to New Zealand 1929-30  at Test Cricket Tours

1929 in English cricket
1930 in English cricket
1929 in New Zealand cricket
1930 in New Zealand cricket
1929 in Australian cricket
1929 in Ceylon
New Zealand cricket seasons from 1918–19 to 1944–45
Australian cricket seasons from 1918–19 to 1944–45
Sri Lankan cricket seasons from 1880–81 to 1971–72
1929
1929
1929-30
International cricket competitions from 1918–19 to 1945